Peter Pike may refer to:

 Peter Pike (British politician) (1937–2021), British politician, MP (1983–2005)
 Peter Pike (Australian politician) (1879–1949), Australian politician, member of the Tasmanian House of Assembly
 Peter Pike (priest) (born 1953), Welsh Anglican priest